Ernesto Rigamonti (1864 in Milan – 1942) was an Italian painter.

He  resident in Milan. He exhibited in 1883 at Milan: Rosso di sera Bel dì, si spera and Rustico; in 1884 at Turin, Le frutta dell' orto. At the 1891 Exposition triennale of the Brera Academy, he exhibited, Interno studio dal vero and a landscape titled Il Gorgazzo a Poicenico.

References

1864 births
1942 deaths
Italian genre painters
Italian landscape painters
19th-century Italian painters
Italian male painters
20th-century Italian painters
Painters from Milan
19th-century Italian male artists
20th-century Italian male artists